Commissioning Support for London (CSL) was a shared service of the National Health Service in England.

Its role was to support London's commissioners – those responsible for planning, developing, monitoring and reviewing health and social care services – to deliver a more efficient healthcare service, share best practice and reduce duplication. Its main focus was on business intelligence services, consultation and training for commissioners.

Following a consultation regarding the future of CSL that commenced on 1 December 2010, the organisation was closed on 31 March 2011. London Health Programmes was set up to host several functions of CSL that will continue. These include clinical reviews of London's services, such as mental health and cancer, clinical and health intelligence and the London Health Observatory (LHO).

CSL's work on commissioning skills development and its commercial services products, such as claims and contract management, are no longer provided.

References

External links 
 London Health Programmes
 NHS London

Health in London